Let Me Fly may refer to:

 Let Me Fly (album), a 2017 album by Mike + The Mechanics
 "Let Me Fly" (Debbie Scerri song), the Maltese entry in the Eurovision Song Contest 1997
 "Let Me Fly" (Styles & Breeze song)
 "Let Me Fly" (DMX song)
 "Let Me Fly", a song by Status Quo from If You Can't Stand the Heat..., 1978